West Charlton United Presbyterian Church, also known as "Scotch Church," is a historic Presbyterian church at 1331 Sacandaga Road in West Charlton, Saratoga County, New York.  It was built about 1880 and is a rectangular, wood-frame building in the Late Victorian style. It features engaged corner towers and a polygonal chapel added in 1904. The north tower supports a louvered belfry topped by a tall spire. The church was founded by immigrants from Scotland.

It was listed on the National Register of Historic Places in 1998.

References

External links
West Charlton United Presbyterian Church website

Presbyterian churches in New York (state)
Churches on the National Register of Historic Places in New York (state)
19th-century Presbyterian church buildings in the United States
Churches in Saratoga County, New York
Scottish-American history
National Register of Historic Places in Saratoga County, New York
Carpenter Gothic church buildings in New York (state)